Ioan Naom (born 11 April 1951) is a Romanian former footballer who played as a midfielder. After he retired from playing football he worked mainly at Bihor Oradea's youth center where he taught and formed generations of players, which include Ovidiu Hoban, Mihai Neșu, Cosmin Vâtcă and Ramses Gado.

Honours
Steaua București
Cupa României: 1969–70, 1970–71
Olimpia Satu Mare
Divizia B: 1973–74
Bihor Oradea
Divizia B: 1981–82

Notes

References

External links
Ioan Naom at Labtof.ro

1951 births
Living people
Romanian footballers
Association football midfielders
Liga I players
Liga II players
Faur București players
FC Steaua București players
FC Rapid București players
FC Olimpia Satu Mare players
FC Bihor Oradea players
Romanian football managers
Footballers from Bucharest